was an international table tennis player from Japan.

Table tennis career
From 1961 to 1965 she won several medals in singles, doubles, and team events in the World Table Tennis Championships and in the Asian Table Tennis Championships.

Her eight World Championship medals included four gold medals; two in team event, one in the doubles with Kimiyo Matsuzaki at the 1963 World Table Tennis Championships and one in the mixed doubles with Koji Kimura at the 1965 World Table Tennis Championships.

She died at the age of 77 on September 18, 2019.

See also
 List of table tennis players
 List of World Table Tennis Championships medalists

References

Japanese female table tennis players
Asian Games medalists in table tennis
Table tennis players at the 1962 Asian Games
2019 deaths
Year of birth missing
Place of birth missing
Asian Games gold medalists for Japan
Asian Games bronze medalists for Japan
Medalists at the 1962 Asian Games
1940s births